Alloway Creek is a  tributary of the Monocacy River in Pennsylvania and Maryland in the United States. Via the Monocacy River, it is part of the Potomac River watershed.

Flow 
The creek rises in Pennsylvania and flows in the northwest corner of Carroll County, Maryland and southeast of Adams County, Pennsylvania. The creek mouths at Palmer and empties into the Monocacy River and Piney Creek.

Starners Dam Bridge 
The Starners Dam Bridge is a steel stringer bridge over the creek on Baptist Road in Taneytown, Carroll County, Maryland. It is also called Alloway Creek Bridge.

See also
List of rivers of Maryland   
List of rivers of Pennsylvania

References

Rivers of Pennsylvania
Rivers of Adams County, Pennsylvania
Rivers of Maryland